was a village located in Taga District, Ibaraki, Japan.

History 
On April 1, 1889, Hanakawa village was formed by the merger of three villages in Shimosōda, Kuruma, Nakatsuma, Kamikotsuda, Simokotsuda, Azuhata, Usuba and Hanazono.

On April 1, 1955, Hanakawa village merged with Isohara town to form Isohara town. 

On March 31, 1956, Isohara town merged with Ōtsu town, Hiragata town, Minaminakagō village, Sekinami village, and Sekimoto village, to form Kitaibaraki city.

Population changes

Population 
 1891 - 2,274
 1902 - 2,364
 1920 - 6,778
 1935 - 4,917
 1947 - 6,850
 1950 - 7,580

Number of households 
 1920 - 1,675
 1935 - 1,097
 1947 - 1,426
 1950 - 1,537

References 

Dissolved municipalities of Ibaraki Prefecture